The 2017–18 season was Lille OSC's 74th season in existence and the club's 18th consecutive season in the top flight of French football.

Players

Squad information
As of 1 February 2018.

Out of squad

Out on loan

Transfers

In

Out

Competitions

Ligue 1

League table

Results summary

Results by round

Matches

Coupe de France

Coupe de la Ligue

Statistics

Appearances and goals

|-
! colspan="12" style="background:#dcdcdc; text-align:center"| Goalkeepers

|-
! colspan="12" style="background:#dcdcdc; text-align:center"| Defenders

|-
! colspan="12" style="background:#dcdcdc; text-align:center"| Midfielders

|-
! colspan="12" style="background:#dcdcdc; text-align:center"| Forwards

|-
! colspan="12" style="background:#dcdcdc; text-align:center"| Players transferred out during the season

|-

References

Lille OSC seasons
Lille OSC